Nate Dwyer (born September 30, 1978) is a former American football defensive tackle of the National Football League. He was drafted by the Arizona Cardinals in the fourth round of the 2002 NFL Draft. He played college football at Kansas.

On April 13, 2013 he married his Junior High/High school sweetheart Martha Vandenberg. Together they have 4 children.  

In 2003, Dwyer and his wife started a truck parts company called Performance Truck Products based out of Tomball, TX.

Dwyer was also a member of the Seattle Seahawks.

References

1978 births
Living people
People from Stillwater, Minnesota
American football defensive tackles
Kansas Jayhawks football players
Arizona Cardinals players
Seattle Seahawks players
Players of American football from Minnesota